Plainsong is a bestselling novel by Kent Haruf.

Set in the fictional town of Holt, Colorado, it tells the interlocking stories of some of the inhabitants.

The title comes from a type of unadorned music sung in Christian churches, and is a reference to both the Great Plains setting and the simple style of the writing.

The novel was adapted in 2004 into a Hallmark Hall of Fame TV movie on CBS.

It is the first of a trilogy, the remaining two novels being Eventide and Benediction.

Plot summary
The book follows several stories of families in a small town in eastern Colorado. Maggie is the link between many of the other characters and strands of the novel. She introduces Victoria to the McPheron brothers, and has a romantic relationship with Tom.

Central characters
Tom Guthrie, a history teacher whose wife is growing more distant and disturbed.
Ike and Bobby, Tom's young sons that struggle with the abandonment of their mother.
Victoria Roubideaux, one of Tom's teenage pupils. When Victoria becomes pregnant, her alcoholic mother forces her to leave the house. Maggie Jones allows her to live with her until she is frightened by Jones's senile father. She later comes to live with the McPherons. 
Raymond and Harold McPheron, bachelor farmers who give Victoria a home and care for her.
Maggie Jones, another schoolteacher at the local school who first takes in Victoria, but Victoria leaves because of Maggie's father's behavior.

Critical reception
The New York Times called it "a novel so foursquare, so delicate and lovely, that it has the power to exalt the reader." and Salon described reading the book as "like being in an expertly piloted small plane, finding yourself flying low and smooth over the suddenly wondrous world below". Plainsong won the Mountains & Plains Booksellers Award, the Maria Thomas Award in Fiction, and was a finalist for the National Book Award, the Los Angeles Times Book Prize, and The New Yorker Book Award.

References

External links
Meet the Writers: Kent Haruf Barnes and Noble profile and interview
Book review: Plainsong Salon.com, Maria Russo, October 18, 1999

1999 American novels
Alfred A. Knopf books
Novels about teenage pregnancy
Novels set in Colorado
English-language novels
American novels adapted into films
American novels adapted into television shows